A United Nations Secretary-General selection was held in June 2021 to choose the Secretary-General of the United Nations. Incumbent Antonio Guterres was the only official candidate for the position. On June 8, 2021, Guterres was unanimously recommended by the United Nations Security Council (SC) for a second term at the helm of the organisation. His re-election was ratified by the United Nations General Assembly (GA) by acclamation on June 18, 2021, without a vote. Guterres commenced his second term on 1 January 2022.

Background 

Article 97 of the United Nations Charter, states "The Secretary-General shall be appointed by the General Assembly upon the recommendation of the Security Council". As a result, the selection is subject to the veto of any of the five permanent members of the Security Council. The Charter's minimal language has since been supplemented by other procedural rules and accepted practices.

Although different regions have held the office, no secretary from Eastern Europe has ever been selected Secretary-General. No woman has ever been selected either. In 2016 there were various international campaigns to select an eastern European or a woman. Despite this, the selection was won by the only candidate who was neither female nor from Eastern Europe. In 2021, some groups attempted to revive the campaign to elect a woman at the helm of the United Nations, but no female candidate was nominated by a member state to be considered by the Security Council.

Candidates 
In order to be eligible for selection, a candidate must be nominated by at least one member state.  On June 8, the day the security council convened to recommend a candidate to the general assembly, there was only one official candidate in the selection process (incumbent Antonio Guterres), and seven additional self-declared applicant candidates.

Official Candidates 
The incumbent Secretary General António Guterres confirmed he would be seeking a second five-year term.

Other notable declared candidates 

Arora Akanksha, audit coordinator for the United Nations Development Programme since 2017
Rosalía Arteaga, President of Ecuador from February 9, 1997 to February 11, 1997. This candidate was proposed by the Forward campaign, an initiative promoted by Colombe Cahen-Salvador and Andrea Venzon of the Atlas Movement.

Campaign 
By May 2021, Incumbent Antonio Guterres had already secured the support of all five permanent members of the United Nations Security Council, the European Union and of the Non-aligned Movement, leading some observers to believe that his re-election was almost a certainty.

Endorsements

Results 
On June 8, 2021, the Security Council unanimously adopted a resolution recommending António Guterres for a second term at the helm of the United Nations.  His re-election was ratified by the United Nations General Assembly by acclamation on June 18, 2021, without a vote.

References 

United Nations Secretariat
Secretaries-General of the United Nations
United Nations General Assembly elections
2021 elections
2021 in international relations